Daniel Promislow is a biogerontologist and a professor at the University of Washington. He studies aging through systems biology and metabolomics approaches. He is a director of the Canine Longevity Consortium, and heads up the Dog Aging Project.

References

Biogerontologists
Living people
Year of birth missing (living people)
University of Washington faculty
Place of birth missing (living people)